is a passenger railway station located in the city of Koshigaya, Saitama, Japan, operated by the private railway operator Tōbu Railway.

Lines
It is also located adjacent to Minami-Koshigaya Station on the Musashino Line.

Station layout
The station consists of two elevated island platforms serving four lines, with the station building located underneath.

Platforms

Adjacent stations

History
It was renamed  on 20 November 1911, and was renamed Kita-Koshigaya from 1 December 1956. From 17 March 2012, station numbering was introduced on all Tobu lines, with Kita-Koshigaya Station becoming "TS-22".

Future developments
Chest-high platform edge doors are scheduled to be added by the end of fiscal 2020.

Passenger statistics
In fiscal 2019, the station was used by an average of 53,007 passengers daily.

Surrounding area
 Bunkyo University (Koshigaya Campus)
 Ōsawa Katori Shrine

See also
 List of railway stations in Japan

References

External links

  

Railway stations in Japan opened in 1899
Railway stations in Saitama Prefecture
Tobu Skytree Line
Stations of Tobu Railway
Koshigaya, Saitama